Yakup Kadri Birinci (born 24 November 1967) is a Turkish alpine skier. He competed at the 1984, 1988 and the 1992 Winter Olympics.

References

1967 births
Living people
Turkish male alpine skiers
Olympic alpine skiers of Turkey
Alpine skiers at the 1984 Winter Olympics
Alpine skiers at the 1988 Winter Olympics
Alpine skiers at the 1992 Winter Olympics
Sportspeople from Erzurum
20th-century Turkish people